Kali Chhapar is a census town in Chhindwara district in the Indian state of Madhya Pradesh.

Demographics
 India census, Kali Chhapar had a population of 10,692. Males constitute 52% of the population and females 48%. Kali Chhapar has an average literacy rate of 69%, higher than the national average of 59.5%: male literacy is 77%, and female literacy is 60%. In Kali Chhapar, 11% of the population is under 6 years of age.

Transport
The nearest airport is Jabalpur.

References

Cities and towns in Chhindwara district